Graham Seed (born 12 July 1950, in London) is an English actor.

Education
Seed was educated at Charterhouse School, an independent boarding school in the market town of Godalming in Surrey, followed by RADA in London.

Career
Seed is best known for his role playing Nigel Pargetter in the BBC radio series The Archers from 1983 until January 2011, although actor Nigel Carrington briefly played the role when Seed took a break in the late 1980s. Seed appeared in the well-known "Is it on the Trolley?" sketch, alongside Victoria Wood (its author) and Duncan Preston in the series Victoria Wood: As Seen on TV.

After his character's death in The Archers in 2011, Seed played himself as the villain in a Radio 4 pantomime who plans to bring down Radio 4 by releasing the Pips, but ultimately falls to his death whilst retrieving a banner, paralleling his Archers character. In addition to The Archers, Seed has appeared in the TV soap operas Brookside (1995–97, as Dick Thornton), Coronation Street (1981, as a solicitor) and Crossroads (1985–88, as Charlie Mycroft).

Seed's roles include the teenage Britannicus, son of the emperor Claudius in the BBC adaptation of Robert Graves' I, Claudius (1976), Harrop in William Boyd's Channel 4 Film Good and Bad at Games (1983) and Jorkins in the first episode "Et in Arcadia ego" of the  Granada Television television adaptation of Brideshead Revisited (1981). He also appeared in ATV's Edward the Seventh (1975), Bergerac (1981), C.A.B. (1986) Midsomer Murders (2009)  and Wild Target (2010).

Personal life
Seed and his first wife, Claire Colvin, were parents to theatre producer Nicola, and jazz guitarist Toby (1988–2018). In 2013, Seed married theatre producer Denise Silvey.

Filmography
Gandhi (1982) – Wicket-keeper

References

External links

Graham Seed at the British Film Institute
Graham Seed (Aveleyman)

1950 births
Living people
English male film actors
English male radio actors
English male television actors
People educated at Charterhouse School
Alumni of RADA